Emilie Preyer (1849–1930) was a German painter known for her still life paintings.

Biography
Preyer was born on 6 June 1849 in Düsseldorf, Germany. She was taught to paint by her father, the still life painter Johann Wilhelm Preyer. She had a successful career selling her works to Americans and Germans. She died on 23 September 1930 in Düsseldorf,

Gallery

References

External links

 
1849 births
1930 deaths 
19th-century German women artists
20th-century German women artists
Artists from Düsseldorf